Haumea is a genus of bivalves belonging to the family Pectinidae.

The species of this genus are found in Indian and Pacific Ocean.

Species:

Haumea loxoides 
Haumea minuta 
Haumea rehderi

References

Pectinidae
Bivalve genera